Léonard Dutz (born 6 August 1947) is a Belgian wrestler. He competed in the men's Greco-Roman 63 kg at the 1968 Summer Olympics.

References

External links
 

1947 births
Living people
Belgian male sport wrestlers
Olympic wrestlers of Belgium
Wrestlers at the 1968 Summer Olympics
People from Kelmis
Sportspeople from Liège Province